Rupinder Singh "Gippy" Grewal (born 2 January 1983), is an Indian actor, singer, film director and producer whose works span over Punjabi and Hindi film industry.

His single "Phulkari" was very successful in the Punjabi music industry. He made his acting debut in the 2010 movie, Mel Karade Rabba, and which he followed with Carry On Jatta, Lucky Di Unlucky Story, Bhaji in Problem and Jatt James Bond. He revived "PTC Best Actor Award" in 2011 for his performance in the 2011 film  Jihne Mera Dil Luteya. He received the "PIFAA Best Actor Award" in 2012 along with Diljit Dosanjh and received "PTC Best Actor Award" in 2015 for Jatt James Bond along with Diljit Dosanjh. He is owner of production houses Humble Motion Pictures and Big Daddy Films along with his brother Sippy Grewal.

Personal life
Grewal was born in Ludhiana and his hometown is Koom Kalan, Ludhiana. He did his schooling from Nankana Sahib Public School, Kot Gangu Rai and studied at North India Institute of Hotel Management, Panchkula. His brother Sippy Grewal is a distributor based in Australia.

Grewal is married to Ravneet Kaur and has three sons.

Music career

Grewal made his debut with the album Chakkh Lai was produced by Atul Sharma. He followed with the albums Aaja Ve Mitraa,Mele Mitraan De, Phulkari 2 and many more. He become a famous name in Punjabi Music among the audience. In 2021, his eighth album "Desi Rockstar" produced by Aman Hayer was a huge hit and was very much loved by Audience. After the album he released song " Angreji Beat" with Yo Yo Honey Singh which proved to be the biggest song of his career. He enjoyed his prime time of stardom during 2010-2014 making him leading artist in Punjabi Music Industry . In 2012 his song "Angreji Beat", featured in the Bollywood film Cocktail.

The video for his 2013 single "Hello Hello" was shot in Las Vegas, Nevada. He performed at the Sandwell and Birmingham Mela in 2014.
Before his fame though he was a wedding singer. He frequently performed at weddings in Punjab, India.

Film career

Grewal made his film debut in a supporting role in 2010 Punjabi-language film Mel Karade Rabba. He followed that up with a lead role in Jihne Mera Dil Luteya which became the biggest hit in Punjabi cinema when it released. In April 2012 his film Mirza – The Untold Story released with the highest opening for a Punjabi film at the time.

His next movie Carry On Jatta released in July 2012 and had the second highest opening and total collections for Punjabi film. In 2013, Grewal released the action film Singh vs Kaur and comedy films Lucky Di Unlucky Story, Best of Luck and Bhaji in Problem.

In 2014, he appeared in the dramatic thriller Jatt James Bond. His second film of 2014 was the comedy film Double Di Trouble.

He dubbed a voice in the Punjabi version of A Good Day to Die Hard which was the first Hollywood movie to be dubbed in Punjabi.

In 2015, Grewal entered Bollywood with a guest appearance, portraying pop star Manjeet Manchala in the comedy-drama film Dharam Sankat Mein. He then made his full acting debut in Bollywood with the romantic-comedy film Second Hand Husband.

In 2016, he launched own production house Humble Motion Pictures with his first directional debut Ardaas.

In September 2017 Gippy Grewal starred in his most recent Hindi movie, Lucknow Central, along with Farhan Akhtar. Carry on Jatta 2 released on 1 June 2018.

In 2022, he launched a new production house "Big Daddy Films".

Discography

Studio albums
Chakk Ley	(2002)
Aaja Wey Mitra	2003)
Mele Mittaran De	(2004)
Phulkari 2	(2005)
Akh Larh Gayi (Canada & India)  The Album (UK) (2006)
Chandi De Challe (Canada & India) Im Here (UK) (2007)
My Time To Shine (2008)
Desi Rockstar (2010)
Talwar	(2011)
Desi Rockstar 2	(2016)
The Main Man	(2020)
Limited Edition (2021)

Filmography

Actor

Special appearances

Dubbing roles

Television

Awards and nominations

References

External links
 

1983 births
Living people
Indian male voice actors
Punjabi-language singers
Bhangra (music) musicians
Male actors in Punjabi cinema
Indian film producers
21st-century Indian male actors
Male actors from Ludhiana
Indian folk-pop singers
21st-century Indian singers
Indian male pop singers
Indian male playback singers
Singers from Punjab, India
21st-century Indian male singers
Musicians from Ludhiana